Aleksandre Metreveli and Peng Hsien-yin were the defending champions but chose not to defend their title.

Guido Andreozzi and Jaume Munar won the title after defeating Tomasz Bednarek and Gonçalo Oliveira 6–7(4–7), 6–3, [10–4] in the final.

Seeds

Draw

External Links
 Main Draw

Poznań Open - Doubles
2017 Doubles